Roshan may refer to:

People
 Roshan (music director) (1917–1967), Indian musician and music director, born Roshan Lal Nagrath
 Hrithik Roshan (born 1974), Hindi film actor, son of Rakesh Roshan
 Mostafa Ahmadi-Roshan (1980–2012), Iranian nuclear scientist
 Pir Roshan (1525 – c. 1580), Pashtun warrior and poet
 Rajesh Roshan (born 1955), Bollywood music director
 Rakesh Roshan (born 1949), Indian producer, director and former actor in Bollywood films
 Roshan Cools (born 1975), Dutch neuroscientist
 Roshan Mahanama (born 1966), Sri Lankan cricketer
 Roshan Meka, Indian actor in Telugu films
 Roshan Pilapitiya (born 1975), Sri Lankan actor
 Roshan Ranawana (born 1981), Sri Lankan actor
 Roshan Ravindra, Sri Lankan actor
 Roshan Seth (born 1942), British actor
 Roshan Singh (1892–1927), Indian revolutionary

Other uses
 Roshan (telco), Afghan telecommunications provider
 Rushani language, language spoken in Afghanistan and Tajikistan; sometimes spelled "Roshani"
 Rushon District, district in Tajikistan; sometimes spelled "Roshan"
 Afghan Premier League, the top football league in Afghanistan, also known as Roshan Afghan Premier League due to sponsorship
 Roshan, a boss creature in the video game, Dota 2
 Roshan "Ice Age Baby", a character in Ice Age, who became a popular meme

